Daniel Elias Garcia (born August 30, 1960) is an American prelate of the Roman Catholic Church. He was consecrated an auxiliary bishop for the Diocese of Austin in Texas on March 3, 2015. On January 29, 2019, Garcia was installed as the fifth bishop of the Diocese of Monterey in California.

Biography

Early life and education
Daniel Garcia was born on August 30, 1960, in Cameron, Texas as the first child of Daniel and Sarah Garcia. He graduated from C.H. Yoe High School in Cameron in 1978 and earned an Associate degree from Tyler Junior College in Tyler, Texas, in 1982. Subsequently, he entered formation and earned a Bachelor of Arts degree from Saint Mary's Seminary at the University of St. Thomas in Houston, Texas, in 1984. Garcia completed his Master of Divinity studies at Saint Mary's in 1988. In 2007 he earned a Master of Arts in Liturgical Studies from the Saint John's School of Theology in Collegeville, Minnesota.

Ordination and ministry
Garcia was ordained to the priesthood for the Diocese of Austin by Bishop John E. McCarthy on May 28, 1988. He then served as associate pastor at St. Catherine of Siena Catholic Parish in Austin until 1990. Garcia then served one year terms as associate pastor at Cristo Rey Parish, St. Louis Parish, and then St. Mary Magdalene Parish, all in Austin. He was named pastor of St. Vincent De Paul Parish in Austin in 1995, a position he would hold for the next 18 years.

In addition to serving in parishes, Garcia served on the Priests’ Personnel Board, the College of Consultors, and the Presbyteral Council. He also served as chair of the Presbyteral Council and as dean of the Austin North Deanery. He was a member of the Diocesan Vocation Team, the Liturgical Commission, and the Diaconal Advisory Committee, as well as serving as master of ceremonies for the bishop. On March 3, 2014, Bishop Joe S. Vásquez appointed Garcia as vicar general and moderator of the curia.

Auxiliary Bishop of Austin

On January 21, 2015, Garcia was appointed as an auxiliary bishop of the Diocese of Austin and titular bishop of Capsus by Pope Francis. He received his episcopal consecration on Tuesday, March 3, 2015, from Bishop Vásquez.

Bishop of Monterey

On November 27, 2018,  Francis appointed Garcia as bishop for the Diocese of Monterey.  He was installed on January 29, 2019.

See also

 Catholic Church hierarchy
 Catholic Church in the United States
 Historical list of the Catholic bishops of the United States
 List of Catholic bishops of the United States
 Lists of patriarchs, archbishops, and bishops

References

External links
 Roman Catholic Diocese of Monetrey
 Roman Catholic Diocese of Austin

Episcopal succession

1960 births
Living people
Roman Catholic Diocese of Austin
21st-century American Roman Catholic titular bishops
Religious leaders from Texas
People from Cameron, Texas
Catholics from Texas
Bishops appointed by Pope Francis